Dr. Nirmal Khatri  is an Indian Politician and is Member of Parliament of India. He was a member of the 15th Lok Sabha and also was a member of the 8th Lok Sabha. In both terms, he represented the Faizabad constituency of Uttar Pradesh and is a member of the Indian National Congress political party.

Early life and education 
Nirmal Khatri was born in Faizabad in the state of Uttar Pradesh. He attended the K. S. Saket PG College in Ayodhya, Faizabad and received LL.B and MA (in political science). Subsequently, he was awarded PhD degree. Khatri worked as an advocate and farmer before joining politics.

Political career 
Nirmal Khatri has been in active politics since early 1970s. During his early days, he joined Youth wing of Indian National Congress before gradually moving to Indian National Congress. During his political career, he held several key party positions. Khatri is also a former member and minister in the Uttar Pradesh Legislative Assembly.

Posts held

See also 

 8th & 15th Lok Sabha
 Lok Sabha
 Politics of India
 Parliament of India
 Government of India
 Indian National Congress
 Faizabad (Lok Sabha constituency)
 Uttar Pradesh Legislative Assembly

References 

India MPs 1984–1989
India MPs 2009–2014
1951 births
Indian National Congress politicians
Lok Sabha members from Uttar Pradesh
People from Faizabad
People from Faizabad district
Living people
Uttar Pradesh MLAs 1980–1985
United Progressive Alliance candidates in the 2014 Indian general election